Crash Bandicoot is a video game series created by Andy Gavin and Jason Rubin. It is published by Activision, Sierra Entertainment, Vivendi Universal Games, Konami, Universal Interactive Studios, King, and Sony Computer Entertainment, with entries developed by Polarbit, Toys for Bob, Beenox, Radical Entertainment, Vicarious Visions, Traveller's Tales, Eurocom, King and Naughty Dog. The series debuted in 1996 with the Sony PlayStation video game Crash Bandicoot, premiered in North America on September 9, 1996. Most Crash Bandicoot games have either been platform games or released for Sony consoles and handhelds.

Most of the games in the franchise are platform games, although the series also includes other genres such as racing video games, party games and endless runners. Each game focuses on the titular protagonist Crash Bandicoot, an anthropomorphic orange bandicoot. It also features a large cast of other characters such as Doctor Neo Cortex, Aku Aku, Coco Bandicoot, Crunch Bandicoot, Doctor N. Gin, and Uka Uka. The latest game in the series is Crash Bandicoot: On the Run!, released in March 2021 for Android and iOS.

Main series

Racing

Party

Spin-offs

Mobile

Compilations

Cancelled games

References 

 
Crash Bandicoot